William Evan Price (November 17, 1827 – June 12, 1880) was a businessman and political figure in Quebec, Canada. He was a Conservative Member of Parliament representing Chicoutimi-Saguenay from 1872 to 1874.

Biography
He was born at the Wolfesfield (or Wolfe's Field) Estate (domaine Wolfesfield) in Sillery, in 1827, the son of William Price, a timber baron in the Saguenay region. He joined his father's business, William Price and Company, in the Chicoutimi area. In 1867, with his brothers David Edward and Evans John, he started Price Brothers and Company, which took over the assets of his father's company. In 1872, he defeated Pierre-Alexis Tremblay for a seat in the House of Commons. Although Protestant, he supported the development of Catholic schools in the region. In 1875, he was elected to the Quebec National Assembly in the same riding. He was reelected in 1878 but resigned from his seat in February 1880 because of health problems.

He died at the family estate of Wolfesfield in Sillery, in 1880. Price was buried at Mount Hermon Cemetery in Sillery. A monument was built in his honour at Chicoutimi in 1882. The village of Price, Quebec is named after him.

References

External links

PRICE, WILLIAM EVAN at the Dictionary of Canadian Biography

Liberal Party of Canada MPs
Members of the House of Commons of Canada from Quebec
Conservative Party of Quebec MNAs
Canadian businesspeople
Politicians from Quebec City
Anglophone Quebec people
Canadian people of Welsh descent
1827 births
1880 deaths
Burials at Mount Hermon Cemetery
People from Sainte-Foy–Sillery–Cap-Rouge